Inspector Gadget is a 1999 American superhero comedy film directed by David Kellogg and written by Kerry Ehrin and Zak Penn from a story by Ehrin and Dana Olsen. Loosely based on the 1980s animated television series of the same name, the film stars Matthew Broderick as the title character, Rupert Everett as Dr. Claw, Michelle Trachtenberg as Penny, and Dabney Coleman as Chief Quimby. Three new characters were introduced such as Dr. Brenda Bradford (played by Joely Fisher), Mayor Wilson (played by Cheri Oteri) and the Gadgetmobile (voiced by D. L. Hughley). The film tells the story of how Inspector Gadget and Dr. Claw came to be. It was filmed in Pittsburgh, Pennsylvania; Baton Rouge, Louisiana; and Los Angeles, California, with the castle-like main tower of Pittsburgh's PPG Place playing a central role.

Produced by Caravan Pictures and DIC Entertainment (which was owned by The Walt Disney Company at the time of production), the film was released theatrically by Walt Disney Pictures on July 23, 1999. It was the last film produced by Caravan Pictures, before the company merged into Spyglass Entertainment; in an ironic moment of foreshadowing, the Caravan logo at the end of the film has the man in said logo sprout a propeller from his hat à la Gadget before flying away offscreen, never to be seen again. It was also dedicated to the memory of production designer Michael White, who died on January 19, 1999, in Los Angeles during production of the film at the age of 36.

The film had a worldwide gross of $134 million against a $90 million budget, while also receiving negative reviews from critics, who gave some praise towards the acting, but criticized the screenplay, visual effects, humor, and lack of faithfulness to the source material (particularly when Dr. Claw shows his face). It lost the studio approximately $30 million. It was followed by the 2003 direct-to-video sequel Inspector Gadget 2, though only D. L. Hughley reprised his role as the voice of the Gadgetmobile.

Plot
John Brown lives in Riverton, Ohio, with his niece Penny and her pet beagle Brain. Dreaming of becoming a police officer, John works as a security guard for the Bradford robotics laboratory. Artemus Bradford and his daughter Brenda are designing a lifelike robotic foot as part of the Gadget Program, designed to add android officers to the Riverton Police Department. Sanford Scolex, a tycoon, steals the foot to build an army of androids from its technology, assassinating Artemus in the process. John chases after Scolex's limousine in his hatchback, but both vehicles crash. John is left for dead by getting blown up in his car by Scolex's Dynamite stick disguised as a cigar, but a bowling ball launched by the explosive blast from the destroyed car lands in the limo and crushes Scolex's left hand. Scolex receives a mechanical claw from his associate Kramer, taking on the alias "Claw".

Brenda decides to make John, who nearly died from the intensely heavy-injuries from the fiery car explosion, the first test subject for the Gadget Program. John is transformed into a crimefighting cyborg, with the alias of "Inspector Gadget", who is powered by a control chip. John is given an orientation from Brenda, which goes horribly awry, and he is also given a lesson from a guru. The lesson ends in failure, however, when John accidentally emasculates the guru. He is helped by the Gadgetmobile, a robotic car with a chatty AI, and one day, despite initially struggling to use his new gadgets, Gadget manages to stop two criminals who were trying to rob a car.

At a charity ball, Scolex approaches Brenda, having known her at Harvard, inviting her to work for him in her own laboratory. Brenda accepts, unaware that Scolex plans to steal her technological ideas and designs. Unimpressed with Gadget, police chief Quimby assigns him to menial assignments rather than investigate Artemus’ murder. Upset at not being taken seriously, Gadget investigates on his own, finding a piece of scrap metal which he later connects to Scolex, with help from Penny.

Claw uses Brenda's research to build his own android, "Robo-Gadget", sending him out on a rampage across Riverton to frame the real Gadget. Gadget himself infiltrates Claw's lab to recover the foot, but is caught and deactivated when Claw breaks his chip. Claw's minion Sykes dumps Gadget in a junkyard, then is tasked to dispose of the foot. Brenda encounters her own robotic doppelganger, Robo-Brenda, who confirms Claw stole the foot and murdered her father. Brenda, Penny, Brain, and the Gadgetmobile track Gadget to a junkyard. A kiss from Brenda awakens Gadget, proving his will can control his new body, regardless of whether the chip is needed or not.

After dropping Penny and Brain off at home, Gadget and Brenda chase Claw and Robo-Gadget's limo. Gadget and Robo-Gadget fall off the roof and duel on a bridge, until Gadget removes the latter's head, tossing it into the river, though Robo-Gadget's body runs off. Brenda crashes the Gadgetmobile into Claw's limo, but is taken prisoner. Claw tries to escape in a helicopter, but Gadget appears using his helicopter hat to intercept. Claw destroys it, and Gadget is stuck hanging from the landing skis. Gadget deconstructs a pen that is in his finger (one of his gadgets) and launches the metal ink chamber, sending it bouncing around and making it hit the button on Claw's claw, causing it to clamp shut and break the joystick of the helicopter and send the helicopter out of control. Brenda leaps out of the helicopter onto Gadget's back, but they fall down the side of Scolex's skyscraper, using a parasol to land safely. Claw parachutes down, but lands in the Gadgetmobile and is captured by it. The police arrive to arrest Gadget, but Penny appears with a repentant and reformed Sykes, who confesses his boss's crimes to the police. Saluted and acknowledged by Quimby as an actual member of the police force, Gadget departs with Brenda and Penny, as Claw vows revenge as he is taken away by the cops. Gadget begins a relationship with Brenda.

Cast

During the "Minions Anonymous" scene in the credits, the henchmen include Mr. T and Richard Kiel (who is credited as the "Famous Bad Guy with Silver Teeth", in reference to his role of James Bond's enemy Jaws), as well as Richard Lee-Sung as the "Famous Villain with Deadly Hat", Bobby Bell as the "Famous Identifier of Sea Planes", Hank Barrera as the "Famous Native American Sidekick", Jesse Yoshimura as "Bane of the Bumbling, Idiotic Yet Curiously Successful French Detective's Existence", John Kim as "Son Before Second Son", and Keith Morrison as the "Famous Assistant to Dr. Frankensomething".

Production

Development
Universal Pictures at one point had an option on the film rights to the animated television series in 1993. Ivan Reitman signed on to produce with a script by Jeph Loeb and Matthew Weisman. Inspector Gadget moved to Disney when the film studio bought out DIC Entertainment. At one point, Peter and Bobby Farrelly were considered to write and direct. Martin Scorsese was also considered to direct. Disney eventually hired David Kellogg to direct, best known for The Adventures of Seinfeld & Superman TV commercials and the Vanilla Ice film, Cool as Ice (1991). At one point, Steven Spielberg, a fan of the 1980s cartoon, considered being the film's executive producer, but he was too busy with other films such as Saving Private Ryan.

Casting
Cameron Diaz declined the role of Dr. Brenda Bradford in favor of Any Given Sunday. Brendan Fraser was considered for the role of Inspector Gadget, but turned it down on account of working on George of the Jungle, another live-action Disney film based on an animated cartoon. Kevin Kline, Steve Carell, Tom Hanks, Tim Allen, Mike Myers, Jay Mohr, Jerry Seinfeld, Mel Gibson, Dana Carvey, Michael Keaton, Adam Sandler, and Robin Williams were also considered for the role. When Steven Spielberg considered being the film's executive producer, his two choices for the role of Inspector Gadget were Chevy Chase and Steve Martin, while the Farrelly brothers' choice was Jim Carrey. Lindsay Lohan turned down the role of Penny, due to her working on The Parent Trap. Eddie Murphy, David Alan Grier, and Chris Tucker were considered for the role of the Gadgetmobile. Tim Curry, James Earl Jones, Willem Dafoe, Jack Nicholson, John Lithgow, Tommy Lee Jones and Dennis Hopper were considered for the role of Doctor Claw. Louis C.K. auditioned for a role as a police officer.

Filming
Principal photography began on July 20, 1998, and wrapped on October 3.

Post-production
After a test screening, the film was cut to 78 minutes from the original 110-minute version.

The Gadgetmobile
The Gadgetmobile, designed by Brenda Bradford, is a white & chrome 1962 Lincoln Continental convertible instead of a Matra Murena/Toyota Supra hybrid from the cartoon and can't transform from a minivan to a police vehicle and often drives by itself. It has an artificial intelligence with a male persona. Like most anthropomorphic cars, "his" front bumper is his mouth and he has eyes in his headlights. However, unlike those cars, who have two eyes, he has four. He also has a face on a computer screen on the dashboard and a license plate that reads "GADGET". Among other things, he can camouflage himself, has a radar system to track Gadget's location (and other people's as well), can extend his tires upwards, has retractable jail bars in his back seat (for transporting criminals), a vending machine (options on this include Skittles, M&M's, Surge, Sprite, Coca-Cola and McDonald's), police lights hidden in the hood that mechanically move onto the windshield, and a jet engine he keeps in his trunk. His artificial intelligence has a laid-back personality. The Gadgetmobile openly breaks the law constantly (he is a particular fan of backturns), but claims it is okay: "Speed limits are for cars, not the Gadgetmobile". Comedian D. L. Hughley provides his voice.

Music
The soundtrack of the film, composed by John Debney, contains the singles "All Star" by Smash Mouth and "I'll Be Your Everything" by the boy band Youngstown.

Home media
Inspector Gadget was released on VHS and DVD on December 7, 1999, and re-released on DVD on May 27, 2003, by Walt Disney Home Entertainment.

Reception

Box office
Despite negative reviews from critics and fans of the 1980s cartoon series themselves, the film was a moderate box office success with a worldwide gross of $134.4 million worldwide, against a budget of $90 million. It lost the studio approximately $30 million. In its opening weekend, the film grossed $21.9 million, finishing in second at the box office behind The Haunting ($33.4 million). In the United Kingdom, it grossed just over £7 million.

Critical response
On Rotten Tomatoes, the film holds an approval rating of 20% based on 63 reviews, with an average rating of 4.10/10. The site's critics consensus states: "Despite an abundance of eyecandy, the film doesn't amount to much". Metacritic reports a weighted average score of 36 out of 100 based on 22 critics, indicating "generally unfavorable reviews". Audiences polled by CinemaScore gave the film an average grade of "B" on an A+ to F scale.

Lawrence Van Gelder of The New York Times stated that it "wastes a lot of good talent". In his review for the Chicago Sun-Times, Roger Ebert gave the film one-and-a-half stars out of four and mentioned that fans were angered when Dr. Claw reveals himself in the movie. Ian Freer of Empire Magazine gave the film a two out of five stars.

At the 1999 Stinkers Bad Movie Awards, the film received five nominations: Worst Picture, Worst Director (Kellogg), Most Painfully Unfunny Comedy, Worst Resurrection of a TV Show, and Least "Special" Special Effects.

Expanded franchise

Sequel 

Inspector Gadget 2 is a 2003 made-for-video sequel to Inspector Gadget, with French Stewart taking over the title role. It follows Gadget getting a replacement named G2 (Elaine Hendrix) who is a woman-like version of Gadget. Meanwhile, Dr. Claw gets out of prison and plans to steal gold from the United States Treasury, so it is up to Gadget, Penny, Brain and G2 to stop Claw's plans.

The sequel drew more from its source material than the original film and also experienced a slightly improved critical reception, earning a 40% rating on Rotten Tomatoes based on 5 reviews. The film was released on March 11, 2003.

Reboot 
In May 2015, a new film with a rebooted version of the character was in development, with Dan Lin as producer. In October 2019, Mikey Day and Streeter Seidell were hired to write the film.

References

External links

 
 
 
 
 
 
 

Inspector Gadget
1999 films
1999 action comedy films
1990s science fiction comedy films
1990s children's films
American films with live action and animation
American action comedy films
American slapstick comedy films
American science fiction comedy films
American detective films
American children's comedy films
American superhero films
Puppet films
Cyborg films
1990s English-language films
Fictional portrayals of the Pittsburgh Bureau of Police
Films directed by David Kellogg
Films scored by John Debney
Films produced by Roger Birnbaum
Films set in 1999
Films set in Pittsburgh
Films shot in Los Angeles
Films shot in Louisiana
Films shot in Pittsburgh
Live-action films based on animated series
Films with screenplays by Zak Penn
1990s superhero comedy films
Caravan Pictures films
DIC Entertainment films
Walt Disney Pictures films
1990s police comedy films
1990s American films
1990s French films